Produce 101 Japan is a 2019 Japanese reality competition show and a spin-off of the South Korean television series Produce 101. The show followed 101 trainees with the intention of producing an 11-member boy band. The members, group name, and concepts were selected by viewers, referred to as "national producers". The series was first announced in April 2019 as a co-production between Yoshimoto Kogyo and CJ E&M and premiered on September 25, 2019, with the first and final episodes airing on TBS while the full series were streamed on GyaO! beginning September 26, 2019.

The final top 11 members debuted as the permanent group, JO1.

Background

In April 2019, Yoshimoto Kogyo and CJ E&M announced they would be co-producing a Japanese version of the Produce 101 reality competition show with the intention of debuting an 11-member boy band in 2020 for the global music market. The group created from the show would be permanent and would be handled by Lapone Entertainment. Auditions for the show took place from April 11 to May 31, 2019 for male Japanese residents aged 16–30 years old who were not tied to any talent agency. Additional exams were held in June and July 2019. A total of 6,000 people auditioned for the show, and all 101 trainees were revealed on September 3, 2019, with the show's theme song, "Tsukame (It's Coming)". Prior to the show's airing, two contestants had dropped out, leaving 99 trainees to compete on the show. Contestant Kenya Hata later dropped out of the series before the show was broadcast.

Several episodes were shot in Paju, South Korea, before returning to Japan. The mentors for the trainees consist of Hidenori Sugai and Sayaka Yasukura as vocal instructors; A-non and Warner as dance instructors; and Cypress Ueno and Bose as rap instructors. Hideyuki Yabe and Takashi Okumura from the comedy duo Ninety-nine, who had previously hosted the Asayan talent competition series in 1999, were the MCs for the show. The series premiered on TBS on September 25, 2019 and GyaO! on September 26, 2019 for a total of 12 episodes. Only the first and final episodes were broadcast on TBS, while GyaO streamed the entire series.

In light of the Mnet vote manipulation investigation, the production committee stated in November 2019 that they were not affiliated with the Korean production team and had a separate voting system, with votes analyzed by a group of third-party lawyers. Following the departure of South Korean contestants Kim Hee-cheon, Kim Youn-dong, and Jeong Young-hoon, the production committee issued a statement explaining that the contestants were eligible for the show, as they were living in Japan at the time, and that their mandatory military service was not a reason why they left. In addition, they issued an official warning to viewers not to spread malicious rumors about the contestants on social media.

Contestants 

Color key

Rankings

The top 11 contestants, which determined the members of the final group, were chosen through popularity online voting at Produce 101 Japan GyaO! homepage and audience's live voting. The results were shown at the end of each episode.

For the first and second voting period, viewers were allowed to select 11 trainees per vote. During the third round, the system changed to 2 trainees per vote and added votes from Softbank Line Friend. For the final round, the system changed to one trainee per vote and added live online votes.

Color key

First voting period

The first voting period took place between September 26 at 12 AM and October 18 at 5:00 AM (JST). The total number of votes accumulated was 33,847,705.

Second voting period

The second voting period took place between October 24 at 11:30 PM and November 8 at 5:00 AM (JST). The total number of votes accumulated was 18,945,494.

Third voting period

The third voting period will take place between November 14 at 11:30 PM and November 29 at 5:00 AM (JST). The total number of votes accumulated was 8,356,702.

Result

The finale online voting period took place between December 5 at 11:00 PM and December 11 at 5:00 AM (JST) and The finale was held on December 11 at 7:00 PM (JST), and open online voting period was broadcast live. The total number of votes accumulated was 3,242,751. Ninety-nine announced the unit boy group name, JO1.

Discography

Extended plays

Singles

Reception

Ratings on TBS

Aftermath
 JO1 released their debut single "Protostar" on March 4, 2020.
 
 Some trainees formed/joined with groups:
 Yugo Miyajima (12th), Shunya Osawa (13th), Tomoaki Ando (14th), Jun Uehara (20th), Jeong Young-hoon (21st), Kim Yoon-dong (22nd), and Kim Hee-cheon (35th) formed a boy group called Orbit under agency Dream Passport. They released their debut album 00 on November 11.
 Kosuke Honda (15th), Fumiya Sano (23rd), Shuta Urano (34th), Katsunari Nakagawa (63rd) signed with Yoshimoto Kogyo and formed a boy group called OWV. They released the music video for their first single "Uba Uba" on August 31.
 Raira Sato (16th), Minato Inoue (18th), Koshin Komatsu (24th), Hikaru Kitagawa (38th) joined a boys group called Bugvel and will release their first song "Warning" under agency Dream Passport.
 Migakida Kanta (27th), Kento Kitaoka (48th) and Takeru Gutierez (71st) joined a group called BXW under agency Churros. Reito Kitagawa (26th) who also had joined the group subsequently left due to difference in the direction of activities. The group released their debut song "Takai Yume ni" on October 22, 2020.
 Tatsutoshi Miyazato (28th), Sho Fukuchi (30th), Taiga Nakamoto (32nd), Tsubasa Takizawa (37th), Kyo Yamada (45th), Ryono Kusachi (51st), Toi Nakabayashi (55th), Hyuga Nakatani (57th), Fumiya Kumazawa (97th) signed with Showtitle, a subsidiary company of Yoshimoto Kogyo. The nine ex-trainees formed a performance unit called Enjin that will also incorporate singing, dancing, and stage play. The group had their major debut in December under label Nonagon Records, from Universal Sigma. Their debut stage titled Nonagon―Hajimari no Oto was held in Tokyo on December 4.
 Masanami Aoki (29th), Akihito Furuya (44th), Koki Nishio (53rd), Takehiro Okada (54th), and Akira Takano (67th) formed a unit named NVRLND.
 Kaito Okano (33rd), Yu Ando (47th), Rikuto Omizu (64th), Hikari Inayoshi (74h), and Tatsuki Yuki (80th) formed a "KJ-Hop" group called Boom Trigger under World Entertainment. They released their debut single "Shaking/Party Must Go On" on August 13.
 Some trainees signed with agencies:
 Masahiko Imanishi (17th) signed with agency Dream Passport and adapted a stage name Hico. He then released his 1st digital single "Strawberry" (feat.TOMO) on December 25.
 Ryuji Sato (25th), Hiroto Ikumi (36th), and Keiya Taguchi (65th) signed with RBW Japan and joined their trainee program RBW JBOYZ. Ryuji Sato then leave the company on December 28.
 Kengo Hata (86th) signed with Ito Company. He then starred in a stage play "Egu Onna" on November 13-15th.
 Satoshi Yamada (85th) signed with YKA Entertainment.
 Some trainees debuted as actors:
 Naoki Ozawa (29th) starred in a stage play K.B.S Project Super Youth Chorus Comedy "SING!"-2020.
 Some trainees released their single:
 Lee Min-Hyuk (42th) released his 1st digital single "Pray" on August 1 under a stage name Hyuk.
 Masaki Ageda (49th) released his 1st digital single "u" on October 26.
 Hayato Isohata (70th) released his 1st digital single "Endless Hope" on December 25.
 Some trainees participated in other survival shows:
 Ryo Mitsui (41st), Ryuta Hayashi (43rd), Gen Suzuki (82nd) joined . Mitsui and Hayashi won the competition and will debut in the boys group NIK.
 Hiroto Ikumi (36th) and Keiya Taguchi (65th) joined Produce Camp 2021. Keiya ranked 78th and Hiroto ranked 15th.
 Hiroto Ikumi (36th) will participate in Boys Planet.

Franchise

Notes

References

External links
  

Japanese music television series
Produce 101
Reality competition television series